Beryly Logos Lubala (born 8 January 1998), commonly known as Bez Lubala, is a Congolese footballer who plays as a forward for Blackpool of the . He previously played for Birmingham City, where he began his senior career, Crawley Town and on loan to Northampton Town and Colchester United.

Life and career
Lubala was born in the Democratic Republic of the Congo and raised in Leicester, England, where he attended  St Paul's Catholic School. As a youngster, he played football for Carib SSFC, Leicester Nirvana and Friar Lane & Epworth. He was noticed by representatives of Birmingham City's academy while playing in a trial game in 2014, and took up a scholarship with the club that summer. Interviewed later that year, he assessed his strength as his attacking play, and felt he needed to improve his left foot.

Birmingham City
He signed his first professional contract, of one year, in April 2016. A year later, after playing regularly for the under-23 team, he signed another one-year deal, with the option of a second year. He played in the first team's pre-season friendly against Kidderminster Harriers, and in February 2018, the club confirmed that it would be taking up their option on Lubala's contract. With Che Adams suspended and Isaac Vassell and Sam Gallagher injured, he was included on the bench for the Championship fixture at home to Burton Albion on 7 April. He remained unused, but made his debut three days later, away to Bristol City, replacing Jérémie Boga after 69 minutes with his team 2–1 behind; the match ended 3–1.

Lubala was a regular member of the first-team squad in 2018–19, and the first few months of the season was frequently included in the matchday squad. He made one start in the EFL Cup defeat to Reading and three fleeting substitute appearances in the Championship. At the end of the season he was offered a new contract, of one year with the option of a second, but no agreement could be reached between club and player.

Crawley Town
On 21 June 2019, Lubala signed a two-year contract with Crawley Town, managed by former Birmingham City coach Gabriele Cioffi. The deal included an option for a third year and an undisclosed sell-on clause. He scored in each of Crawley's first four League Two matches. Away to Carlisle United, he "shook off a challenge and cut in from the left before firing a low shot through the [goalkeeper's] legs" to tie the scores before the hosts won 2–1, and at home to Salford City, he converted a penalty to open the scoring and had several other chances as his side won 2–0. After goals against Scunthorpe United and Crewe Alexandra, Lubala's fifth goal of the season, a deflected finish in the 17th minute of a 1–0 EFL Cup win against Norwich City on 27 August 2019, gave Crawley a first ever victory over top-flight opposition. He said afterwards that "this was the best night of my short career so far". He had a strong season with Crawley, scoring 13 goals in 41 appearances in all competitions across the curtailed 2019–20 season.

Blackpool
On 1 September 2020, Lubala was signed by League One side Blackpool for an undisclosed fee, signing a three-year contract with the club.

Loans
Lubala joined Northampton Town on 31 January 2022 on loan for the rest of the season.

After making one appearance for his parent club in the 2022–23 EFL Cup, Lubala joined League Two club Colchester United on loan for the remainder of the season. He made his debut on 3 September as a half-time substitute with his side 1–0 down at home to Hartlepool United, and headed the equalising goal from Cameron Coxe's cross in the fifth minute of stoppage time.

Career statistics

Personal life
On 26 January 2022, Lubala was found not guilty of rape by a Brighton jury.

References

External links
 Profile at Crawley Town F.C. website

1998 births
Living people
Democratic Republic of the Congo footballers
Footballers from Leicester
Association football forwards
Leicester Nirvana F.C. players
Birmingham City F.C. players
Crawley Town F.C. players
Blackpool F.C. players
Northampton Town F.C. players
Colchester United F.C. players
English Football League players
21st-century Democratic Republic of the Congo people